Septimius Acindynus was a Roman consul with Valerius Proculus in 340 AD. He was governor of Antioch when he imprisoned a man who had been unable to pay a pound of gold into the public treasury. He released him after his wife, with his own sanction, "listened to the persuasions" of a rich man; but the rich man had filled her purse with earth instead of gold. He revealed his fraud to Acindynus. Condemning himself for the rigor which had led to the crime, Acindynus paid the gold himself, and gave the woman the field from which the earth had been brought.

References

Imperial Roman consuls
4th-century Romans
Praetorian prefects of the East
Septimii